Chapters from a Vale Forlorn is the second album by Swedish power metal band Falconer.

Track listing 
All songs written by Stefan Weinerhall, except where noted.

The Japanese bonus track is a Swedish folk song written by Björn Afzelius called "En Kungens Man" (3:58).
"We Sold Our Homesteads" is a traditional Swedish song; the lyrics were translated into English by Mathias Blad.

Credits
Mathias Blad - vocals and keyboards
Stefan Weinerhall - guitars and bass
Karsten Larsson - drums

Guests
Lead guitar on "Busted to the Floor" by Andy LaRocque
Violin on "Portals of Light" by Sami Yousri
Backing vocals on "Portals of Light" by Johan Wikström
Flute by Sabine Daniels
Piano on "Portals of Light" and Hammond organ on "Busted to the Floor" by Elias Holmlid (Dragonland)

References

2002 albums
Falconer (band) albums
Metal Blade Records albums